Peter Vilhelm Franzén (born 14 August 1971) is a Finnish actor, author, screenwriter, and director. He is best known for his role as King Harald Finehair in Vikings (2016–2020).

Personal life
Franzén was born in Keminmaa, north Finland. Franzén has described his childhood as difficult due to his violent and alcoholic stepfather. Later, Franzén's relationship to his abusive stepfather was a major focal point in his semi-autobiographical novel, Above Dark Waters. He met his actress wife Irina Björklund while studying in Theatre Academy of Finland. In 1999 the couple moved to Los Angeles, where they lived until 2013, after which they moved to Roquevaire, France. They had a son, born in September 2007.

Career
As an actor, Franzén has appeared in over 50 films and TV series. For his role in Dog Nail Clipper, Franzén was awarded a Jussi Award for Best Actor as well as earning praise from film critic Jay Weissberg from Variety magazine who called the actor "one of the most talented and versatile thesps in Finland".

In his career he has appeared in Finnish, Estonian, German, English, Swedish, and Hungarian speaking roles. In 2015, Franzén was cast as King Harald Finehair from the fourth season of Vikings. Franzén has also been cast in Amazon Prime Video's The Wheel of Time TV series.

Filmography

Films

Television

Writing
In 2010 Franzén published a partly autobiographical novel Tumman veden päällä (Above Dark Waters).

In 2013 Franzén wrote Samoilla silmillä, a sequel to Tumman veden päällä.

In 2017 Tammi published Särkyneen pyörän karjatila, third book by Franzén.

Directing
In 2013 Franzén directed the film "Above Dark Waters", based on novel he had written in 2010. In 2020, he directed and narrated a viking-themed short movie called "Age of Vikings: Fated" which was shot in Old Swedish.

Singing
In 2021 Franzén sang the song Þat Mælti Mín Móðir (My Mother Told Me), that was performed by the Swedish band Hindarfjäll. The song first appeared in the TV-series Vikings where it was sung by Harald Finehair (portrayed by Peter Franzén). Here Franzén reprises his performance, singing the song in the Old Norse language.

Awards and honours

In 2013 Franzén was awarded the Pro Finlandia Medal of the Order of the Lion of Finland.

References

External links 

 

1971 births
Living people
People from Keminmaa
Finnish male film actors
Finnish male television actors
Male actors from Los Angeles
Finnish expatriates in France
Finnish expatriates in the United States